Alcoutim is a former civil parish, located in the municipality of Alcoutim, Algarve, Portugal. In 2013, the parish merged into the new parish Alcoutim e Pereiro.

Main sites
Alcoutim Castle
Roman village of Montinho das Laranjeiras
Alcoutim Old Castle
Nossa Senhora da Conceição Church

References

Former parishes of Portugal
Freguesias of Alcoutim